Jonathan Eysseric (born 27 May 1990) is a French professional tennis player.

Tennis career

Juniors
In 2007, he was the junior finalist at the 2007 Australian Open. At the 2007 French Open, he competed in the men's and juniors singles draws. In men's doubles he competed with Jérémy Chardy, losing in tiebreak sets to seeded Martin Damm and Leander Paes. In mixed doubles, he competed with Alizé Cornet, where they reached the second round. Kellen Damico and Eysseric also competed in the boys' doubles final with Kellen Damico of the United States, and both seniors and juniors singles competitions, losing in four sets in singles and lost to Ričardas Berankis of Lithuania, despite being seeded second. He won the 2007 U.S. Open boys' doubles title with Jérôme Inzerillo as the 6th-seeded team, beating first-seeded Vladimir Ignatic and Roman Jebavý in the semifinals and Grigor Dimitrov and Vasek Pospisil in the final.

As a junior Eysseric compiled a singles win–loss record of 76–26 (and 62–18 in doubles), reaching the No. 1 junior combined world ranking in January 2007.

Junior Grand Slam results:

Australian Open: F (2007)
French Open: 3R (2007, 2008)
Wimbledon: 3R (2007)
US Open: QF (2006)

Pro tour
He received a wildcard to the 2008 French Open, but he lost to Britain's Andy Murray after having pushed him to 5 sets.

ATP career finals

Doubles: 1 (1 runner-up)

Challenger and Futures finals

Singles: 24 (16–8)

Doubles: 70 (41 titles, 29 runner-ups)

References

External links
 
 

1990 births
Living people
French male tennis players
People from Grasse
Sportspeople from Saint-Germain-en-Laye
US Open (tennis) junior champions
Grand Slam (tennis) champions in boys' doubles
Sportspeople from Alpes-Maritimes